Erik Vardanyan (born 7 June 1998) is an Armenian former professional footballer who played as a midfielder.

Career

Pyunik
On 24 October 2019, Vardanyan extended his contract with Pyunik.
On 27 October 2019, Vardanyan was sent off in a 4–2 defeat away to Ararat Yerevan, pushing the referee Henrik Nalbandyan and swearing at the opposition fans in the process. As a result, on 1 November 2019, Vardanyan was handed a six-month suspension until 30 April 2020.

Sochi
On 5 November 2019, Pyunik and PFC Sochi announced the transfer of Erik Vardanyan, with the transfer to be finalised on 1 January 2020. Erik was considered one of the most promising Armenian football talents at the time, and earned call ups to Armenia's senior national team. Even though his contract with Sochi was technically not active until 2020, he was not eligible to play for Pyunik due to disqualification, and therefore joined Sochi and started training with the squad immediately upon signing. The disqualification applied to the Russian Premier League.

Pyunik loan
On 10 July 2021, Pyunik announced the return of Vardanyan to the club on loan from Sochi.

Urartu
On 17 February 2022, Vardanyan signed with Urartu. On 29 December 2022, Vardanyan announced his retirement from football due to a knee injury, and that he would become a football scout for Urartu.

Career statistics

Club

International

Statistics accurate as of match played 29 March 2022

International goals

References

1998 births
Living people
Armenian footballers
Association football midfielders
Armenia under-21 international footballers
Armenia youth international footballers
FC Pyunik players
FC Mika players
PFC Sochi players
FC Urartu players
Armenian Premier League players
Russian Premier League players
Armenia international footballers
Armenian expatriate footballers
Expatriate footballers in Russia
Armenian expatriate sportspeople in Russia